Aereniphaula is a genus of beetles in the family Cerambycidae, containing a single species, Aereniphaula machadorum. It was described by Galileo and Martins in 1990.

References

Aerenicini
Beetles described in 1990
Monotypic Cerambycidae genera